The Conoco-Phillips Building is a 22-story,  office building begun in 1981 and completed in 1983 as the ARCO Building, at 700 G Street in downtown Anchorage, Alaska and is the tallest building in both Anchorage and the state of Alaska.  It was designed by the Luckman Partnership of Los Angeles, in association with local architects Harold Wirum & Associates.  It is the tallest building in the state, and with the nearby Robert B. Atwood Building, predominantly defines the center of the skyline of the city.

The actual building is more of a complex, composed of the atrium, connecting with a smaller office tower. The main tower houses the Alaska regional corporate headquarters of ConocoPhillips, while the smaller tower consists of local branches of major companies, including the New York Life Insurance Company and KPMG.  There is also a branch of the Alaska Club gym in the building.

The sky-lit atrium is open to the public, and has a small food court, as well as a water fountain. Sometimes public events are held here, notably the annual summer Wild Salmon on Parade local art auction.

See also
List of tallest buildings by U.S. state
Robert B. Atwood Building
List of tallest buildings in Anchorage

References

1983 establishments in Alaska
ConocoPhillips
Skyscrapers in Anchorage, Alaska
Office buildings completed in 1983
Oil company headquarters in the United States
Skyscraper office buildings in Alaska